Miaenia is a genus of beetles in the family Cerambycidae, containing the following species:

Subgenus Acanthosciades
 Miaenia latia (Blair, 1940)
 Miaenia latispina (Gressitt, 1956)

Subgenus Aegocidnus
 Miaenia binaluensis (Breuning, 1956)
 Miaenia cebuensis (Breuning, 1957)
 Miaenia costulata (Pascoe, 1864)
 Miaenia flavomaculata Fisher, 1925
 Miaenia grammica (Pascoe, 1864)
 Miaenia ignara (Pascoe, 1864)
 Miaenia insularis (Fisher, 1934)
 Miaenia jubata (Pascoe, 1864)
 Miaenia mindoroensis Breuning, 1957
 Miaenia variabilis Aurivillius, 1927

Subgenus Estoliops
 Miaenia argentipleura (Gressitt, 1956)
 Miaenia aureopleura (Gressitt, 1956)
 Miaenia fasciata (Matsushita, 1943)
 Miaenia longicollis (Breuning & Ohbayashi, 1964)
 Miaenia sakishimana (Gressitt, 1951)

Subgenus Granuuilmiaenia
 Miaenia granulicollis (Gressitt, 1938)

Subgenus Indoaegocidnus
 Miaenia binhana (Pic, 1926)
 Miaenia ceylanica (Breuning, 1957)
 Miaenia gilmouri (Breuning, 1962)
 Miaenia hongkongensis Breuning, 1968
 Miaenia indica (Breuning, 1956)
 Miaenia inlineata (Pic, 1936)

Subgenus Miaenia
 Miaenia andamanensis Breuning, 1957
 Miaenia brevicollis (Gressitt, 1951)
 Miaenia demarzi (Breuning, 1963)
 Miaenia doreyi (Breuning, 1963)
 Miaenia elongata (Gressitt, 1951)
 Miaenia hirashimai (Samuelson, 1965)
 Miaenia irrorata Pascoe, 1864
 Miaenia luzonica Breuning, 1959
 Miaenia maritima Tsherepanov, 1979
 Miaenia marmorea Pascoe, 1864
 Miaenia masbatensis Breuning, 1957
 Miaenia meridiana (Ohbayashi, 1941)
 Miaenia mindanaonis Breuning, 1957
 Miaenia minuta (Fisher, 1936)
 Miaenia nakanei (Hayashi, 1956)
 Miaenia papuensis (Breuning, 1963)
 Miaenia perversa (Pascoe, 1864)
 Miaenia pulchella (Heller, 1924)>
 Miaenia quadriplagiata (Breuning, 1958)
 Miaenia retrospinosa Breuning, 1963
 Miaenia rufula Fisher, 1925
 Miaenia samarensis Breuning, 1961
 Miaenia subfasciata (Schwarzer, 1925) 
 Miaenia uniformis (Breuning, 1957)
 Miaenia variegata Fisher, 1925
 Miaenia woodlarkiana (Breuning, 1957)

Subgenus Micronesiella
 Miaenia atollorum (Gressitt, 1956)
 Miaenia attenuata (Gressitt, 1956)
 Miaenia boharti (Gressitt, 1956)
 Miaenia esakii (Gressitt, 1956)
 Miaenia mariana (Gressitt, 1956)
 Miaenia palauicola (Gressitt, 1956)
 Miaenia saltatrix (Gressitt, 1956)
 Miaenia subcylindrus (Gressitt, 1956)
 Miaenia townesi (Gressitt, 1956)
 Miaenia versicolora (Gressitt, 1956)

Subgenus Nonymoides
 Miaenia carolinensis (Blair, 1940)
 Miaenia subglabra (Gressitt, 1956)

Subgenus Pomeranaegocidnus
 Miaenia neopomeriana (Breuning, 1957)
 Miaenia papuana (Breuning, 1957)

Subgenus Pseudocidnus
 Miaenia anoplos (Ohbayashi N., 1976)
 Miaenia fujiyamai (Matsumura & Matsushita, 1933)
 Miaenia hirsuta (Ohbayashi N., 1976)
 Miaenia inhirsuta (Pic, 1897)
 Miaenia lanata (Ohbayashi N., 1976)
 Miaenia nobuoi (Breuning & Ohbayashi, 1964)
 Miaenia satoi (Ohbayashi N., 1976)
 Miaenia tonsa (Bates, 1873)
 Miaenia vagemarmorata (Breuning, 1957)

Subgenus Sibuyomiaenis
 Miaenia sibuyanensis Fisher, 1925

Subgenus Tonkinomiaenia
 Miaenia rondoniana (Breuning, 1965)
 Miaenia tonkinensis (Pic, 1944)

Subgenus Truncatomiaenia
 Miaenia botelensis (Gressitt, 1951)
 Miaenia exigua (Gahan, 1900)
 Miaenia melanotis Pascoe, 1864
 Miaenia suffusa Pascoe, 1864

References

 
Acanthocinini